Cetatea Suceava was a professional football club from Romania, based in Suceava and founded in 2004 and dissolved in 2010.

History
The club was founded in the summer of 2004, to continue the city's football tradition after Foresta was moved back to Fălticeni and after CSM Suceava (Bucovina Suceava) was dissolved a few years back.

The club's first season in history was synonymous to its first great performance, when it finished first in Divizia C, and was promoted to Divizia B. At the end of the 2005–06 season of Divizia B, Cetatea finished fifth, only to relegate the next season, when it finished 15th, just two points behind FCM Câmpina, the last team to save itself. The following season, 2007–08 of the Liga III, Cetatea finished first with 76 points out of 34 games and was promoted back. The next season of the Liga II, 2008–09, was one of big struggle, Cetatea avoiding relegation only because the last four teams that were relegated withdrew from the championship.

Cetatea Suceava was excluded from the championship during the winter break of the 2009–10 season, because of approximately 1 million € debt (unpaid wages to the players and coaches and unpaid taxes to the state and other private partners). The club lost all its remaining matches, 3–0.

In July 2010, the club re-entered in the competitions organised by the FRF, and competed in the 2010/2011 season of the Romanian Cup. The club also wanted to enter in the 2010/2011 season of the Liga III and to be able to be promoted to Liga II.

On 2 August 2010, the club was registered at the FRF and competed in the 2010/2011 season of the Liga III. It withdrew from the championship just a few days before it started.

It didn't register at any competition level in the 2011–12 season, thus being dissolved.

Honours

Liga III:
Winners (2): 2004–05, 2007–08

References

Association football clubs established in 2004
Association football clubs disestablished in 2010
Defunct football clubs in Romania
Football clubs in Suceava County
Liga II clubs
Liga III clubs
Suceava
2004 establishments in Romania
2010 disestablishments in Romania